Kuala Batee is a district in Southwest Aceh Regency, Aceh, Indonesia. Kuala Batee was attacked by American land and naval forces in 1832 after the crew of a U.S. merchant ship were killed in the area.

List of villages 
Listed according to mukim.
 Mukim Krueng Batee
 Alue Pisang
 Ie Mameh
 Keude Baro
 Krueng Batee
 Lama Tuha
 Lhok Gajah
 Drien Beureumbang
 Rumoh Panyang

 Mukim Kuta Bahagia
 Blang Makmur
 Krueng Panto
 Geulanggang Gajah
 Kuala Teurubue
 Kuta Bahagia
 Panto Cut
 Pasar Kota Bahagia
 Krueng Panto

 Mukim Sikabu
 Alue Padee
 Blang Panyang
 Kampung Teungoh
 Lhung Geulumpang
 Muka Blang
 Padang Sikabu

Reference 
  Kecamatan Kuala Batee dalam Angka 2016

Southwest Aceh Regency